The 1908 season for Auckland consisted of four representative matches played in an effort to grow the game in Auckland and New Zealand. The team was chosen prior to the formation of the Auckland Rugby League so were an ‘unofficial’ Auckland team though they were very strong nonetheless and many of the players went on to represent Auckland and New Zealand in the ensuing years. Several of the players were also strongly involved in the establishment of club sides and the growth of the game in Auckland for many years to come such as Albert Asher, Charles Dunning, William Wynyard, and Ronald MacDonald.

The games
The four matches were against Wellington and Taranaki with games being played in Auckland, Wellington and New Plymouth. They resulted in 3 wins and a draw.
Prior to the last match of the season against Taranaki at Victoria Park the promoters of the proposed Auckland League stated clearly their intentions. They said that it was not their intention to pay players for home matches. If any profits accrued from their last match it would be “banked to form the nucleus of a ground fund. It will be the policy of the league to provide players with uniforms, free brake trips to grounds, and payment for loss of wages when away from Auckland on tour”. They went on to say that the tour had not been profitable. The money they had gained from Wellington’s visit in August had been lost while on tour due to travel costs and other expenditure. They hoped to “stimulate a strong local competitions next season” and had secured a ground at Epsom for play.

Representative matches

Auckland v Wellington

Auckland v Wellington

Auckland v Taranaki
This match was originally supposed to be played on the recreation ground but after pressure from the rugby union it was moved to the Tukapa Cricket Field adjacent to Western Park. There were further issues with seating as the advertised seats for spectators did not arrive at the ground. Taranaki won the match by 5 points to 3 and it was suggested that Auckland had deliberately thrown the match to stir up interest in the return match. Though the closeness of the game back in Auckland would suggest this might not have been the case.

Auckland v Taranaki

Auckland representative matches played and scorers

References

External links
 Auckland Rugby League Official Site

        
        
        

Auckland Rugby League seasons
Auckland Rugby League